The Pettit Cleaners Building, at 114 E. 8th Ave. in Winfield, Kansas, was built in 1947.  It was listed on the National Register of Historic Places in 2005.

The original portion was built in about 1880. In 1947 local architect William N. Canton designed the current Streamline Moderne facade.

References

Commercial buildings on the National Register of Historic Places in Kansas
Moderne architecture in the United States
Buildings and structures completed in 1947
Cowley County, Kansas